Lovund is an island and village in the municipality of Lurøy in Nordland county, Norway.  The island is located west of the Solvær islands and southeast of the Træna islands.  Lovund is notable for the large puffin breeding colony located on the rocky north slope of the island.

The village of Lovund (sometimes called Strand) is located in the northeastern part of the island. Lovund Church, located in the village, serves the people of the island.

Name
The Old Norse form of the name might have been Laufund. The first element is then lauf which means "leaf" or "broad-leaved trees", referring to the fact that the western part of the island is covered with a forest. The last element is the suffix -und meaning "land". (see Borgund).

Media gallery

References

Lurøy
Islands of Nordland
Villages in Nordland